Malo Globoko is a small settlement on the right bank of the Krka River opposite Fužina in the Municipality of Ivančna Gorica in central Slovenia. The area is part of the historical region of Lower Carniola. The municipality is now included in the Central Slovenia Statistical Region.

References

External links
Malo Globoko on Geopedia

Populated places in the Municipality of Ivančna Gorica